A deep-cycle battery is a battery designed to be regularly deeply discharged using most of its capacity. The term is traditionally mainly used for lead–acid batteries in the same form factor as automotive batteries; and contrasted with starter or 'cranking' automotive batteries designed to deliver only a small part of their capacity in a short, high-current burst for cranking the engine. 

For lead-acid deep-cycle batteries there is an inverse correlation between the depth of discharge (DOD) of the battery and the number of charge and discharge cycles it can perform; with an average "depth of discharge" of around 50% suggested as the best for storage vs cost. 

Newer technologies than the traditional lead-acid (such as lithium-ion batteries) are becoming commonplace in smaller sizes in uses such as smartphones and laptops.  The new technologies are also beginning to become common in the same form factor as the automotive lead-acid batteries, although at a large price premium.

Types of lead-acid deep-cycle battery 

The structural difference between deep-cycle and cranking lead-acid batteries is in the lead battery plates. Deep cycle battery plates have thicker active plates, with higher-density active paste material and thicker separators. Alloys used for the plates in a deep cycle battery may contain more antimony than that of starting batteries. The thicker battery plates resist corrosion through extended charge and discharge cycles.

Deep-cycle lead-acid batteries generally fall into two distinct categories; flooded (FLA) and valve-regulated lead-acid (VRLA), with the VRLA type further subdivided into two types, Absorbed Glass Mat (AGM) and Gel. The reinforcement of absorbed glass mat separators helps to reduce damage caused by spilling and jolting vibrations. Further, flooded deep-cycle batteries can be divided into subcategories of Tubular-plated Opzs or flat plated. The difference generally affects the cycle life and performance of the cell.

Flooded 
The term "flooded" is used because this type of battery contains a quantity of electrolyte fluid so that the plates are completely submerged. The electrolyte level should be above the tops of the plates which serves as a reservoir to make sure that water loss during charging does not lower the level below the plate tops and cause damage. Flooded batteries will decompose some water from the electrolyte during charging, so regular maintenance of flooded batteries requires inspection of electrolyte level and addition of water. Major modes of failure of deep-cycle batteries are loss of the active material due to shedding of the plates, and corrosion of the internal grid that supports active material. The capacity of a deep cycle battery is usually limited by electrolyte capacity and not by the plate mass, to improve life expectancy.

New technologies
Although still much more expensive than traditional lead-acid, a wide range of rechargeable battery technologies such as lithium-ion are increasingly attractive for many users.

Applications 

 Cathodic protection, which might include marine use
 Other marine use, especially on a sailboat lacking power generation capability, generally smaller vessels
 Trolling motors for recreational fishing boats
 Industrial electrically-propelled forklifts and floor sweepers
 Motorized wheelchairs
 Off-grid energy storage systems for solar power or wind power, especially in small installations for a single building or motorhome
 Power for instruments or equipment at remote sites
 Recreational vehicles
 Traction batteries to propel vehicles, such as golf carts, and other highway electric vehicles
 Traffic signals
 Uninterruptible power supply ('UPS'), usually for computers and associated equipment, but also sump pumps
 Audio equipment, similarly to a UPS but also in certain 'clean power' devices to supply clean DC power isolated from the public electric supply for inversion to AC to maximize audio signal reproduction

Recycling 

According to the Battery Council International ("BCI") -- a lead-acid battery industry trade group -- the vast majority of deep cycle batteries on the market today are lead acid batteries. BCI says lead acid batteries are recycled 98% by volume, 99.5% by weight. According to BCI, the plastic cases, lead plates, sulfuric acid, solder, and other metals are 100% recovered for reuse. BCI says the only part of a battery that is not recyclable is the paper separators that wrap the plates (due to the acid bath the paper sits in, the fiber length is reduced so far that it cannot be rewoven).

BCI says that, industry wide, there is a greater than 98% rate of recovery on all lead acid batteries sold in the United States, resulting in a virtually closed manufacturing cycle.

See also 
 Desulfation
 Electric vehicle battery
 Gel battery
 VRLA battery
 Opzs
 List of battery types

References

External links 
 
 Battery Council International
 Car and Deep-Cycle Battery FAQ 7.0

Battery types
Energy storage